Andrew Philip Sopko (born August 7, 1994) is an American former professional baseball pitcher.

Career
Sopko attended Loyola Sacred Heart High School in Missoula, Montana. He played basketball at Loyola Sacred Heart, but Montana does not have high school baseball, so he played American Legion Baseball for the Missoula Mavericks. Sopko committed to attend Gonzaga University to play college baseball for the Gonzaga Bulldogs. The San Diego Padres selected him in the 14th round, with the 435th overall selection, of the 2012 Major League Baseball draft. He opted not to sign, and enrolled at Gonzaga. In 2014, he played collegiate summer baseball with the Bourne Braves of the Cape Cod Baseball League.

The Los Angeles Dodgers selected him in the seventh round, with the 222nd overall selection, of the 2015 MLB draft. He signed with the Dodgers for a $147,500 signing bonus and made his professional debut with the Ogden Raptors of the Rookie-level Pioneer League in July 2015. After making six starts for Ogden, the Dodgers promoted him to the Great Lakes Loons of the Class A Midwest League. In 2016, he started the season with Great Lakes and was promoted to the Rancho Cucamonga Quakes of the Class A-Advanced California League in April. He pitched for the Tulsa Drillers of the Class AA Texas League in 2017, In 2018 he started the season with the Rancho Cucamonga Quakes and was promoted  back to Tulsa in June 2018.

On January 11, 2019, the Dodgers traded Sopko and Ronny Brito to the Toronto Blue Jays for Russell Martin. Sopko was released on November 20, 2020.

Personal life
Sopko's father, Paul, moved to Missoula from Cleveland. Andrew grew up as a fan of the Cleveland Indians. His older brother, Sam, played college baseball at Willamette University.

References

External links

Living people
1994 births
People from Missoula, Montana
Baseball players from Montana
Baseball pitchers
Gonzaga Bulldogs baseball players
Bourne Braves players
Ogden Raptors players
Great Lakes Loons players
Rancho Cucamonga Quakes players
Tulsa Drillers players
Glendale Desert Dogs players
New Hampshire Fisher Cats players
Buffalo Bisons (minor league) players
Gulf Coast Blue Jays players